"Is It 'Cos I'm Cool?" is a single released by German DJ Mousse T. from his second album, All Nite Madness (2004). The song features vocals from Emma Lanford and became Mousse T.'s third top-10 hit on the UK Singles Chart, reaching number nine. Elsewhere, the song reached the top 20 in Austria, Finland, and Italy and peaked within the top 50 in several other countries.

Charts

Weekly charts

Year-end charts

Release history

References

Mousse T. songs
2004 singles
2004 songs